Parliamentary elections were held in Yugoslavia on 11 December 1938. The result was a victory for the governing Yugoslav Radical Union, which won 306 of the 373 seats in National Assembly.

These would be the last elections held in Yugoslavia before World War II. By the time of the first postwar elections, in 1945, the Communist Party of Yugoslavia was rapidly consolidating power, and the non-Communist opposition boycotted the vote after claiming to have been targeted with severe intimidation. As a result, the 1938 elections would be the last multi-party elections held in Yugoslavia until the Communists gave up their monopoly of power in 1990.

Coalitions
The Yugoslav Radical Union (JRZ, Jereza) led by PM Milan Stojadinović, form an right-wing to far-right alliance with:
Yugoslav National Party led by Bogoljub Jevtić,
Yugoslav Muslim Organization led by Mehmed Spaho,
Slovene People's Party led by Anton Korošec and
People's Radical Party led by Aca Stanojević, which later leaves the alliance in favor of the United Opposition.

The United Opposition alliance was consisted of:
Croatian Peasant Party led by Vladko Maček
Independent Democratic Party led by Srđan Budisavljević
Democratic Party led by Ljubomir Davidović
Agrarian Party led by Jovan Jovanović Pižon
Montenegrin Federalist Party led by Sekula Drljević

Results

Aftermath
Although the United Opposition, de facto led by the Croatian Peasant Party leader Maček, had attracted 44.9% of the vote, due to the electoral rules by which the government parties received 40% of the seats in the National Assembly before votes were counted, the opposition vote only translated into 67 seats out of a total of 373. Milan Stojadinović second cabinet collapsed in February 1939, due to his pro-Axis policy. He was replaced by Dragiša Cvetković as Prime Minister and de jure JRZ leader. The Cvetković–Maček Cabinet was concluded in August 1939 establishing autonomous Banovina of Croatia. Maček became the Deputy Prime Minister of Yugoslavia and several members of the United Opposition were added to the new cabinet. 

Following the Cvetković government sign Yugoslav accession to the Tripartite Pact in March 1941, there was a faction led by the commander of the Royal Yugoslav Air Force (VVKJ), General Dušan Simović, that successfully realized a pro-Allied coup.

Sources

References

External links
The Elections to the Parliament of the Kingdom of the Serbs, Croats & Slovenes 1920 - 1938

Yugoslavia
Parliamentary election
Elections in Yugoslavia
December 1938 events
Election and referendum articles with incomplete results